Jean-Paul Deschatelets,  (October 9, 1912 – December 11, 1986) was a Canadian parliamentarian.

Born in Montreal, Quebec, he was first elected to the House of Commons of Canada in 1953 as a Liberal Member of Parliament for the riding of Maisonneuve—Rosemont. He was re-elected in 1957, 1958, 1962, and 1963. He was Minister of Public Works from 1963 to 1965.

In 1966, he was appointed to the Senate representing the senatorial division of Lauzon, Quebec. He resigned in January 1986.  He was the Speaker of the Senate of Canada from 1968 to 1972.

After his death in 1986, he was entombed at the Notre Dame des Neiges Cemetery in Montreal.

References

 

1912 births
1986 deaths
Liberal Party of Canada MPs
Members of the House of Commons of Canada from Quebec
Members of the King's Privy Council for Canada
Politicians from Montreal
Speakers of the Senate of Canada
Canadian senators from Quebec
Burials at Notre Dame des Neiges Cemetery